Madeline Keryk (born 9 March 1995) is an Australian rules footballer who plays for Port Adelaide in the AFL Women's competition (AFLW). She previously played for Carlton and Geelong .  She was drafted by Carlton with the club's fifteenth selection and the one hundred and fifteenth overall in the 2016 AFL Women's draft. In 2017 AFL Women's Season and made her debut in round 1, the club and league's inaugural match at Ikon Park against . She was delisted by Carlton at the end of the 2018 season. Keryk was redrafted by Geelong with the 62nd overall pick in the 2018 AFL Women's draft. In March 2023, Keryk was traded to Port Adelaide with pick #12 in exchange for Kate Surman.

References

External links

Living people
1995 births
Carlton Football Club (AFLW) players
Australian rules footballers from Victoria (Australia)
Sportswomen from Victoria (Australia)
Geelong Football Club (AFLW) players
Melbourne University Football Club (VFLW) players
Port Adelaide Football Club (AFLW) players